CD82 (Cluster of Differentiation 82), or KAI1, is a human protein encoded by the  gene.

This metastasis suppressor gene product is a membrane glycoprotein that is a member of the tetraspanin/transmembrane 4 superfamily. Expression of this gene has been shown to be downregulated in tumor progression of human cancers and can be activated by p53 through a consensus binding sequence in the promoter. Its expression and that of p53 are strongly correlated, and the loss of expression of these two proteins is associated with poor survival for prostate cancer patients. Two alternatively spliced transcript variants encoding distinct isoforms have been found for this gene.

Interactions 

CD82 (gene) has been shown to interact with CD19, CD63 and CD234.

CD82 plays a key role in the development of endometriosis.

See also 
 Cluster of differentiation

References

Further reading

External links 
 
 

Clusters of differentiation